Daan Dierckx (born 24 February 2003) is a Belgian professional footballer who plays as a center back for Jong Genk, on loan from Parma.

Club career
Dierckx joined Parma in January 2021 from Genk. He made his Serie A debut on 17 January 2021 against Sassuolo.

On 12 August 2022, Dierckx was loaned back by Genk and assigned to the reserve squad Jong Genk in the second-tier Challenger Pro League.

References

External links

2003 births
Footballers from Flemish Brabant
Living people
Belgian footballers
Belgium youth international footballers
Association football defenders
Parma Calcio 1913 players
K.R.C. Genk players
Serie A players
Challenger Pro League players
Belgian expatriate footballers
Belgian expatriate sportspeople in Italy
Expatriate footballers in Italy
Jong Genk players
Sportspeople from Leuven